Kuopion Elo (originally Männistön Elo) is a football club from Kuopio, Finland. They currently play in Nelonen, fifth tier of Finnish football. Elo is the oldest existing football club in Kuopio

History
Kuopion Elo was founded as Männistön Elo by local working class youth in 1919. In past club has also played other sports. From early on their home area have been Männistö and Itkonniemi districts north of Kuopio city center. At the beginning they played only against Kuopion Riento. They played their first match in 1919. In 1929 club possessions where ceased by court as a leftist organization and some members founded a new club called Männistön Urheilijat, some joined Kuopion Kisa-Veikot. In 1946 Männistön Urheilijat continued as Männistön Elo. They have played 3 seasons in Finnish top tier mestaruussarja. In late 1980s club had financial difficulties and they eventually merged with other financially troubled club Koparit to form FC Kuopio. Elo continued football in 2012 season from sixth tier vitonen.

Season to season

3 seasons in Mestaruussarja
20 seasons in I Divisioona
16 seasons in II Divisioona
1 season in Kolmonen
6 seasons in Nelonen
4 seasons in Vitonen

References and sources
Official Kuopion Elo Website
Finnish Wikipedia

References

Football clubs in Finland
Kuopio
1919 establishments in Finland